

In Greek mythology, Thalia or Thaleia ( or) was one of the three Charites or Graces, along with her sisters Aglaea and Euphrosyne.

The Greek word thalia is an adjective applied to banquets, meaning rich, plentiful, luxuriant and abundant.

Thalia is a part of the Nine Muses in Greek mythology. The Muses are the foundation of inspiration, arts and wisdom. The Muses are the daughters of Zeus and Mnemosine who are the amorous counterparts of Apollo's posse of gods.

The Muses, which Thalia is a part of, began their lives as nymphs, or an extensive class of female divinities. The nymphs then presented themselves as whispers in the ears of those that called upon them.

An ancient writer Hesiod summoned them across the world as the nine muses, their names being: Thalia, Clio, Erato, Euterpe, Melpomene, Polyhymnia, Calliope, Terpsichore and Urania. Thalia and the Muses were crucial to the artistic development of ancient Greece. Thalia, the eighth born of her siblings, is known as “the joyous and flourishing” muse. Thalia is one of the two muses of the theater. Thalia inspires comedy, idyllic poetry and conjures the natural world.

Thalia is often portrayed as a giggling, uplifting woman with a slightly jeering expression. Thalia is often portrayed as wearing a crown made of ivy and boots on her feet. Many sculptures of the goddess will show her holding a shepherd's staff. Her most notable signature is the comic mask she carries around with her. Her name, Thalia, means “to flourish” or “flourishing”, it is known that Thalia's songs contained praises which were often found to sound fresh and new even as they aged overtime.

Thalia can often be depicted dancing around in circles with her sisters.  While Thalia and her sisters were mostly worshiped on Mount Helicon, they actually spent a lot of their time on Mount Olympus with the other deities of the Greek pantheon. Thalia and her sisters sang and danced at parties and events as well as singing lamentations at funerals. Thalia is known to play the bugle and the trumpet.

Thalia was the source of a lot of inspiration for actors, authors and poets who resided in Ancient Greece. Thalia's inspiration made comedy emerge from ancient theaters. Thalia often spent time amongst the mortals, guiding them in with the help and encouragement they needed to create art.

Thalia's role on Mount Olympus was very important, as she provided entertainment for deities of Olympus.

Thalia had seven children by Apollo, the god of music and light. Apollo was also Thalia's tutor. Thalia and Apollo's children were known as the Corybantes. The Corybantes were dancers who would often dance and make music to worship Cybele, the Phrygian goddess.

Thalia appears in several writings of many known authors, including Hesiod's Theogony. Thalia has also been depicted in several paintings by artists such as Hendrick Goltzius. A painting of Thalia, which is now housed in the Museum of Fine Arts in Budapest, depicts the goddess placed on what appears to be a throne with an ivy wreath on her head and the shepherd's staff placed in her right hand. The painting was created in 1546. 
Unlike her sisters, Thalia actually was not one of the best known of the Muses in Greek mythology.

Family 
Typically, they were the daughters of Zeus and Oceanid Eurynome. Alternative parentage may be Zeus and Eurydome, Eurymedousa, or Euanthe; Dionysus and Kronois; or Helios and the Naiad Aegle.

In art 
In art, they were usually depicted dancing in a circle. Thalia was the goddess of festivity and rich banquets and was associated with Aphrodite, as part of her retinue.

In popular culture
 The Charite Thalia is referred to in Neal Stephenson's book The Diamond Age.
 Thalia Grace is the demigod daughter of Zeus in the series Percy Jackson & the Olympians.
 Her brother, Jason Grace, keeps the last name, but is named after a Greek Hero named Jason.

Notes

References
Apollodoros, Library (I, 3, 1).
Hesiod, Theogony (v. 907–909).
 Orphic hymns (LIX on the Charites).
Pausanias, Description of Greece (IX, 35, 1).
Pindar, Odes (Olympics, 14, str. 1–2).
Grimal, Pierre, over&source=gbs_ge_summary_r&cad=0#v=onepage&q&f=false The Dictionary of Classical Mythology, Wiley-Blackwell, 1996, . "Thalia" 2. p. 442.
 Smith, William; Dictionary of Greek and Roman Biography and Mythology, London (1873). "Thaleia" 4.

Greek goddesses
Children of Zeus
Children of Dionysus